The 2022–23 SA20  was the inaugural season of the SA20, a franchise Twenty20 cricket league in South Africa, organised by Cricket South Africa (CSA). The tournament was played from 10 January to 12 February 2023. SuperSport, Sky Sports and the Sports18 network broadcast the tournament in South Africa, the United Kingdom and India respectively.

In the final, Sunrisers Eastern Cape defeated Pretoria Capitals by four wickets to win the inaugural title.

Squads
The player auction took place on 19 September 2022.

Venues

Teams and standings

Points table 

  The top four sides advanced to the semi-finals.
 Points – win 4, no result 2. One additional point awarded for a win when the run rate difference is 1.25 greater than the opposing side's.

Position table

League progression

League stage
The full fixture list was released on 7 November 2022.

Playoffs

Semi-finals

Final

Statistics

Most runs

Most wickets

Awards 
On 6 February 2023, the list of end of season awards was announced, to be handed out after the final match.
 

Sources:

References

External links

League home at ESPNCricinfo

2022 in South Africa
Domestic cricket competitions in 2022–23
SA20